Ferdinando de' Medici may refer to various members of the Medici ruling family of Tuscany:

 Ferdinando I de' Medici, Grand Duke of Tuscany, (1549-1609), Grand Duke of Tuscany 1587-1609
 Ferdinando II de' Medici, Grand Duke of Tuscany, (1610-1670), Grand Duke of Tuscany 1621-1670
 Ferdinando (III) de' Medici, (1663-1713), Grand Prince of Tuscany 1663-1713

See also
Ferdinand III, Grand Duke of Tuscany (1769-1824), who was not a Medici